Rudolf Prack (2 August 1905 – 2 December 1981) was an Austrian film actor.

Selected filmography

 Florentine (1937)
 Prinzessin Sissy (1939) - Prince Luitpold
 A Mother's Love (1939) - Felix Pirlinger - 1922
 Krambambuli (1940) - Thomas Werndl
 Ein Leben lang (1940) - Franz Hofbauer
 Beloved Augustin (1940) - Podl Schauerhuber, Musikant
 Spähtrupp Hallgarten (1941) - Oberjäger Unterkirchner
 Die heimlichen Bräute (1942) - Peter Leidinger
 The Golden City (1942) - Großknecht Thomas - Annas Verlobte
 The Big Number (1943) - Peter Stoll
 The Eternal Tone (1943) - Berthold Buchner
 Die unheimliche Wandlung des Axel Roscher (1943) - Zollassistent Alex Roscher
 Reise in die Vergangenheit (1943) - Michael BrantnerLehrer
 Aufruhr der Herzen (1944) - Franz Atzinger
 Orient Express (1944) - Franz Schulz
 Leuchtende Schatten (1945)
 Der weite Weg (1946) - Franz Manhardt
 Glaube an mich (1946) - Hans Baumann
 Liebe nach Noten (1947) - Frank Ewert
 Zyankali (1948) - Polizeikommissar Tanner
 The Queen of the Landstrasse (1948) - Michael von Dornberg
 Everything Will Be Better in the Morning (1948) - Thomas Schott, Sportberichterstatter
 Fregola (1948) - Santos
 A Heart Beats for You (1949) - Martin Hellwanger, Bauer
 Heimliches Rendezvous (1949) - Dr. Stefan Böhme
  (1949) - Willy Lohmeyer, berühmter 6-Tage Rennfahrer
  (1950) - Jonny Williams - Sekretär des Maharadschas
 The Black Forest Girl (1950) - Hans Hauser - ein Maler
 Mädchen mit Beziehungen (1950) - Peter Hauff
 The Lady in Black (1951) - Andreas Osterwald
 Engel im Abendkleid (1951)
  (1951) - Johannes Burghoff, genannt Jean
 The Heath Is Green (1951) - Walter Rainer - Förster
 The Lady in Black (1951) - Nils Corbett
 The Thief of Bagdad (1952) - Achmed
 A Thousand Red Roses Bloom (1952) - Hannes Frings
 Holiday From Myself (1952) - George B. Stefenson
 When the Heath Dreams at Night (1952) - Peter Gelius, Sprengmeister
 Shooting Stars (1952) - Werner Nordhaus
 Come Back (1953) - Martin Larsen
 The Emperor Waltz (1953) - Erzherzog Ludwig
 When The Village Music Plays on Sunday Nights (1953) - Martin
 The Private Secretary (1953) - Direktor Erich Delbrück
 The Big Star Parade (1954) - Dr. Georg Roberts
 Ball at the Savoy (1955) - Paul Alexander
 Heimatland (1955) - Thomas Heimberg
 The Congress Dances (1955) - Czar Alexander I / Uralsky
 Crown Prince Rudolph's Last Love (1956) - Kronprinz Rudolf
 Dany, bitte schreiben Sie (1956) - Hannes Pratt
 Emperor's Ball (1956) - Reichsgraf Georg von Hohenegg
 Roter Mohn (1956) - Stefan von Reiffenberg
 The Simple Girl (1957) - Thomas Krauss
 Heimweh... dort wo die Blumen blüh'n (1957) - Ingenieur Robert Wegner
 Der Page vom Palast-Hotel (1958)
 Die Landärztin vom Tegernsee (1958) - Dr. Rinner - Tierarzt
 The Priest and the Girl (1958) - Walter Hartwig
  (1958) - Carlo
 What a Woman Dreams of in Springtime (1959) - Johannes Brandt
 Aus dem Tagebuch eines Frauenarztes (1959) - Chefarzt Dr. Brückner
 Du bist wunderbar (1959) - Kapitän Chris Behrens
 Ein Herz braucht Liebe (1960)
 The Young Sinner (1960) - Werner Ortmann
 Frau Irene Besser (1961)
 Vertauschtes Leben (1961) - Alexander Bertram
 Mariandl (1961) - Hofrat Franz Geiger
 Mariandl's Homecoming (1962) - Hofrat Franz Geiger
 Schweik's Awkward Years (1964) - Major Ferdinand Hruschkowitz
 Holiday in St. Tropez (1964) - Robert Engelhard
 The Merry Wives of Tyrol (1964) - Musikverleger Karl-Heinz Busch
 Happy-End am Wörthersee (1964) - Johannes Petermann
 Call of the Forest (1965) - Ingenieur Prachner
 Heidi (1965) - Pfarrer
 Ein dreifach Hoch dem Sanitätsgefreiten Neumann (1969) - Erzherzog Rudolf
 Frau Wirtin bläst auch gern Trompete (1970) - Archduke
 Holidays in Tyrol (1971) - Dr. Madesperger
  (1972) - Prof. Dr. Schott
  (1973) - Raimund Anger
 The Hunter of Fall (1974) - Prinzregent
 Karl May (1974) - Sächsicher Justizminister
 Jesus von Ottakring (1976) - Major a.D.
 The Standard (1977) - Lakai - Kaiserlicher Diener im Hof

References

External links
 

1905 births
1981 deaths
Austrian male film actors
Austrian male television actors
Male actors from Vienna
20th-century Austrian male actors